Velykyi Dalnyk is a village (a selo) in Odesa Raion (district) of Odesa Oblast in southern Ukraine. It hosts the administration of Velykyi Dalnyk rural hromada, one of the hromadas of Ukraine. 

Until 18 July 2020, Velykyi Dalnyk belonged to Biliaivka Raion. The raion was abolished in July 2020 as part of the administrative reform of Ukraine, which reduced the number of raions of Odesa Oblast to seven. The area of Biliaivka Raion was merged into Odesa Raion.

Demographics
According to the 1989 census, the population of Velykyi Dalnyk was 7,926 people, of whom 3,689 were men and 4,237 women.

Native language as of the Ukrainian Census of 2001:
 Ukrainian 87.64%
 Russian 10.06%
 Moldovan (Romanian) 1.18%
 Bulgarian 0.37%
 Armenian 0.21%
 Belarusian 0.13%
 Romanian (self-declared) 0.05 %
 German 0.03%
 Gagauz 0.01%

References

Villages in Odesa Raion